Juan Carlo "J.C." Ritchie (born 24 February 1994) is a South African professional golfer. He plays on the European Tour and the Sunshine Tour where he has won ten times.

Professional career
Ritchie's first win on the Sunshine Tour was at Royal Harare Golf Club in the 2017 Zimbabwe Open where he beat Trevor Fisher Jnr at the second hole of a playoff. He was third in the 2018 BMW SA Open and also finished third in the 2017–18 Sunshine Tour Order of Merit. In August 2018 he won the Sun Carnival City Challenge. In March 2019, partnered with Jaco Prinsloo, he won the Sunshine Tour Team Championship and the following week won the Limpopo Championship at the first hole of a playoff with Steve Surry. The following month he won the Zanaco Masters in Zambia, again at the first hole of a playoff against Rhys Enoch. He had two further wins in early 2020, retaining the Team Championship and the Limpopo Championship in successive weeks.

In May 2021, Ritchie won the Bain's Whisky Cape Town Open, beating Jacques Blaauw in a sudden-death playoff. He successfully defended this title in February 2022, winning by one shot ahead of Christopher Mivis. The following week, he won the Jonsson Workwear Open, winning by six shots, again ahead of Mivis.

Professional wins (12)

Sunshine Tour wins (10)

1Co-sanctioned by the Challenge Tour

Sunshine Tour playoff record (4–0)

Challenge Tour wins (4)

1Co-sanctioned by the Sunshine Tour

Challenge Tour playoff record (1–0)

IGT Pro Tour wins (2)

Results in major championships
Results not in chronological order in 2020.

CUT = missed the half-way cut

NT = No tournament due to COVID-19 pandemic

Results in World Golf Championships

1Cancelled due to COVID-19 pandemic

NT = No tournament
"T" = Tied

See also
2022 Challenge Tour graduates
List of golfers with most Challenge Tour wins

References

External links
 
 
 
 

South African male golfers
Sunshine Tour golfers
LIV Golf players
People from Standerton
1994 births
Living people